The Counter Extremism Project (CEP) is a non-profit non-governmental organization that combats extremist groups "by pressuring financial support networks, countering the narrative of extremists and their online recruitment, and advocating for strong laws, policies and regulations".

CEP was formally launched on 22 September 2014, by former senior government officials, including former the Homeland Security adviser Frances Townsend, former Connecticut Senator Joseph Lieberman and Mark Wallace, a former U.S. Ambassador to the United Nations. The mission of the organization is to fight global extremism, with an initial goal of disrupting the financing and online recruitment and propaganda of the Islamic State of Iraq and the Levant (ISIS). The group is modeled on United Against Nuclear Iran, an advocacy group led by Wallace which has had success increasing economic pressure on the Islamic Republic of Iran. Other prominent board members include Gary Samore, August Hanning, Dennis Ross and Irwin Cotler.

CEP is a 501(c)(3) non-profit organization. It can accept tax-deductible contributions on a confidential basis. For security reasons, CEP generally declines to name its financial backers, except for Thomas Kaplan, a billionaire investor who also supports United Against Nuclear Iran.

Digital Disruption Campaign
CEP launched its "Digital Disruption Campaign" to remove accounts associated with ISIS from social media networks in order to deny them popular platforms to incite violence, spread their ideas and recruit members. The campaign has particularly focused on Twitter, calling on the company to adopt new policies to prevent extremists such as ISIS from misusing their platform, as well as identifying ISIS accounts and alerting Twitter to remove them. ISIS has made extensive use of social media, especially Twitter, to recruit fighters and to distribute propaganda videos, including clips that show the decapitation of American journalists and a British foreign aid official. The campaign has led to death threats such as beheading against the CEP president Frances Townsend on Twitter from jihadist accounts.

CEP started by collecting ISIS propaganda to learn how it tailors its messaging to various audiences. CEP had this material translated into English to make it easier for academics, reporters and other researchers to study ISIS and its methods. CEP then crafted a counter-narrative that brought attention to human rights abuses under ISIS, its use of extreme violence against women, children and non-combatants.

YouTube study
A study released by CEP in July 2018, determined that while YouTube had made a great deal of progress towards removing extremist content, terrorists still had a large audience on the site. CEP determined that between March and June 2018 ISIS members and supporters uploaded 1,348 videos to the site which received 163,391 views over the same period. 24% of those videos remained on YouTube for at least two hours. Many of these videos were shared on Facebook, Twitter and other social media sites before YouTube could delete them. These videos were posted using 278 accounts. Roughly 60% of these accounts were allowed to remain active by YouTube despite having been used to upload extremist content that violated the site's terms of use. Hany Farid, a senior advisor to CEP, criticized YouTube. He said, "We know these videos are being created for propaganda purposes to incite and encourage violence, and I find those videos dangerous in a very real way."

CEP searched YouTube using 185 keywords commonly associated with ISIS. These included the Arabic terms for "crusader." "jihad". the names of ISIS-controlled geographic locations, media outlets and propagandists. CEP created a software system that searched YouTube every 20 minutes over the three-month life of the study. The system then used CEP's video identification tool, eGLYPH, to compare the results to 229 known terrorist video clips. eGLYPH generates a unique signature called a "hash" for each video or section of a video. This, in turn, allows known videos to be identified even if they have been edited, copied or otherwise altered.

Global Youth Summit Against Violent Extremism
On 28 September 2015, CEP co-hosted the first Global Youth Summit Against Violent Extremism with the U.S. Department of State and Search for Common Ground at The Roosevelt Hotel in New York City. The event "drew more than 80 youth leaders from 45 countries with the objective of developing outreach and social-media intervention initiatives that can be shared globally". Senior U.S. government officials who addressed the attendees included the U.S. Homeland Security Advisor Lisa Monaco, the Under Secretary of State for Public Diplomacy and Public Affairs Richard Stengel, and the Under Secretary of State for Civilian Security, Democracy, and Human Rights Sarah Sewall. The summit also used presentations from Facebook and Microsoft. A panel of judges at the summit awarded $100,000 to youth activist programs it believed would have the greatest impact.

NORex
In June 2016, CEP unveiled a software tool for use by Internet and social media companies to "quickly find and eliminate extremist content used to spread and incite violence and attacks". A CEP senior advisor. Hany Farid, a computer scientist who specializes in the forensic analysis of digital images, developed the software. It functions similarly to PhotoDNA, a system that uses robust hashing technology that Farid worked on developing with Microsoft, which is "now widely used by Internet companies to stop the spread of content showing sexual exploitation or pornography involving children".
 
To operate this new technology to combat extremism, CEP proposed the creation of a National Office for Reporting Extremism (NORex), which would house a comprehensive database of extremist content and function similar to the National Center for Missing & Exploited Children. President Obama supported this initiative. Lisa Monaco, Obama's top counterterrorism adviser, said, "We welcome the launch of initiatives such as the Counter Extremism Project's National Office for Reporting Extremism that enables companies to address terrorist activity on their platforms and better respond to the threat posed by terrorists' activities online." Wallace stated that if this system were to be adopted by social media companies and the private sector, it "would go a long way to making sure that online extremism is no longer pervasive".

See also
 Global Counterterrorism Forum
 Global Centre for Combating Extremist Ideology

References

External links
 

Foreign policy political advocacy groups in the United States
2014 establishments in the United States
Charities based in New York (state)
Terrorism databases
Counterterrorism in the United States